Imprimatur is the title of an Italian historical novel, written by Rita Monaldi and Francesco Sorti. It was originally published in Italy in 2002; since when it has been translated into twenty languages, and sold a million copies worldwide. It is the first in a series of books based around the principal character of the 17th century diplomat and spy, Atto Melani.

Plot summary

The story is set in a Roman inn in the year 1683. Ten guests of varying origin are resident, including a French guitar player, a Tuscan doctor, a Venetian glass artisan, an English refugee, a Neapolitan astrologer posing as an artist, and an enigmatic Jansenist. Everyone is hiding their own secret. When the French nobleman De Mourai dies suddenly, the inn is placed under quarantine because the authorities believe the plague has broken out. One guest, the mysterious abbot Atto Melani, suspects instead that the Frenchman has been poisoned. Together with a young servant (as narrator), he starts to investigate.
Together Melani and the servant discover a network of ancient tunnels, once used by early Christians to avoid persecution. They also discover that the other guests of the inn are using the tunnels for their own mysterious reasons. While the scenario unfolds, outside the whole Christian world anxiously awaits the outcome of the Turkish siege at the Battle of Vienna. The Christian military coalition has been assembled under the direction of Pope Innocent XI. If the Christian reinforcements arrive too late, Vienna will fall and Europe will be at the mercy of the Ottomans.

Critical reception 

The novel was first published in Italian in March 2002 after the rights were bought by the publishing house, Mondadori (owned by Fininvest). It was reported as the fourth bestselling book at the time, and led to a second edition.
The novel received a number of positive critical reviews in the international literary press. Solander, the American magazine of the Historical Novel Society, and El Pais of Spain compared it with classic 20th century historical novels like Umberto Eco´s The Name of the Rose and The Leopard by Giuseppe Tomasi di Lampedusa.

The Times Literary Supplement, a British literary magazine, said, "Imprimatur starts well and gets better."  The Independent called it "an exuberant and discursive historical novel, crammed with fascinating detail." Scotland on Sunday said, "The authors inject every scene with life, colour, lies and wit." The Herald described it as "a literary page-turner which delivered what Eco could not: a genuinely new discovery which was guaranteed to set the cat among the Vatican pigeons."

In Australia, The Australian reviewer wrote, "A massive, elegant, baroque edifice, superbly written and researched. Imprimatur is as genuine as The Da Vinci Code is phony.  High-minded satire gives way to broad comedy and finally slapstick. Imprimatur is many things: anti-clerical tract, Chaucerian comedy, whodunit, history thesis and Dickensian dose of urban underbelly."
In France, Le Monde  asked, "What should be more admired: the keenness, great narrative talent, and knowledge of philologist Rita Monaldi and musicologist Francesco Sorti, or the masterful style and superior quality of language of a captivating literary creation?" Le Figaro praised the "breathless search for a truth that tears away all the veils of deception." L'Express called the authors "the successors to Umberto Eco."

Style and literary models
Some literary critics have suggested that the book recalls many elements of the traditional detective novel, such as those featuring Sherlock Holmes and Dr Watson; or a murder-mystery by Agatha Christie. Or furthermore a “swashbuckler” set in the baroque age reminiscent of “The Three Musketeers” by Alexander Dumas or Jules Verne. 
Elsewhere, comparisons with the group of characters inhabiting the inn have been drawn with the model used successfully by authors such as Geoffrey Chaucer and Charles Dickens. The authors themselves have stressed the influence of the Italian philosophical novel of the 19th century, Alessandro Manzoni´s “The Betrothed”. Noting that Boccaccio divides his narrative up into days in ‘’The Decameron”, as well as in the Germanic ‘Bildungsroman’.

Background and controversy 

Although the story itself is fiction, many of the persona and events are not. The book is based on research by Monaldi and Sorti, who researched information from 17th-century manuscripts and published works concerning the siege of Vienna, the plague and Atto Melani. 
In an appendix to the book are listed and examined a number of new historical sources discovered by the authors in the Vatican Archive and the Public Record Office of Rome – previously unknown to modern historians, and confirming the theory of a secret agreement between William III and Innocent XI. They called upon scholars and professional historians to deepen this research based on the unearthed material.

Historical context 

The reign of Pope Innocent XI was indeed marked by conflict between the papacy and the French monarchy, in the person of Louis XIV, over matters such as the French claim to what it called the Gallican Liberties. For fear of Louis XIV's dominance, not only Innocent but also Catholic leaders such as the king of Spain and the elector of Bavaria supported William of Orange. The conflict between the papacy and Louis XIV continued under Pope Innocent's immediate successors, Pope Alexander VIII, an ally of William, and Pope Innocent XII.

When news of William's decisive victory over James at the Battle of the Boyne reached Rome, the papal court, still allied with him against Louis XIV, but by then headed by Pope Alexander VIII, is reported to have ordered the singing of a Te Deum of thanksgiving, while similar celebrations were held in Catholic churches in Madrid, Brussels, and Vienna.

Lord Melfort, a strong supporter of King James, reported that the pope "seemed horribly scandalised" that any cathedral had sung a Te Deum for William's victory; but, as historians observed in 1841, "the plain truth is, that William all along had a strong party among the cardinals ... the great principle of the papal court was to check in Italy the progress of the French, who more than once flattered themselves with the hope of becoming masters of the entire Peninsula. There are reasons for believing that, when the Prince of Orange came over to expel his most Catholic father-in-law, he brought some of the pope's money with him to help him in that undertaking."

Professor Eamonn Duffy, a historian at the University of Cambridge has written, "It is widely accepted, because of James's indebtedness to France, that the Pope was actually relieved when James fell."

Follow-up

It has been suggested that the controversial claim damaged the reputation of Pope Innocent and halted canonisation proceedings. The Roman Catholic Church had been keen to promote Innocent's cause as an active opponent of the Ottomans in the light of the terrorist attack by Islamic fundamentalists on 9/11. It was subsequently reported that the authors had been effectively "blackballed by Italian journalism and publishing" because of the embarrassment caused to the church. A spokesman for the Vatican has denied this.

Subsequent novels in the series have been published in English - Secretum in 2009, and Veritas in 2013.

References

2002 Italian novels
Italian historical novels
Fiction set in 1683
Novels set in Rome
Arnoldo Mondadori Editore books